Nyctibates is a monotypic genus of frog in the family Arthroleptidae; its sole species is 
Nyctibates corrugatus. Found in Cameroon, Equatorial Guinea, and Nigeria, its natural habitats are lowland forests in hilly areas, typically forests that have humid, but not marshy, floors; it requires tall forests with closed canopy. Breeding takes place in fast, rocky streams with clean water. There are no significant threats to this species.

References

Arthroleptidae
Monotypic amphibian genera
Amphibians described in 1904
Frogs of Africa
Amphibians of Cameroon
Amphibians of Equatorial Guinea
Amphibians of West Africa
Taxa named by George Albert Boulenger
Taxonomy articles created by Polbot